Forest School Camps (FSC) is an organization that is aimed primarily at children between the ages of 6 and 17. FSC has camps running throughout the year, the main ones lasting 13 nights during late July and August, with one week and weekend camps at Easter and during the spring and early summer.

Being a volunteer-run organization, it relies on cultural/social bonds and enthusiasm from participants for support and staffing rather than monetary incentive. Many, though by no means all, volunteers have 'grown up' in the organisation. FSC is designed to give children, including those who have never camped before experiences, life skills and social skills.

FSC is an English charity registered with the Charity Commission for England and Wales in the United Kingdom, number 306006.

Culture and history 
FSC was originally formed in 1947 by a group of former students and teachers from a radical educational scheme called "Forest School" that started in 1930 in the New Forest. The school later moved to Whitwell Hall  in Norfolk, but the building was requisitioned at the start of World War II and the school had to close.

Forest School had connections with a diverse range of cultures such as the Woodcraft movements, Native Americans cultures and the Quakers. FSC has developed its own distinct culture with traditions and internal practices. Many of the traditions have developed out of physical necessity, such as Rally (a meeting of everyone on the Camp where they discuss what is going to happen through the day), Clan (a vertical age sub-group of the lodge that prepares the meals for the day) or the Arise song, though others sprang forth from cultural and aesthetic bases, such as Merrymoot, or the Camp Songs.  The camp songs are sung round a big camp fire and are a great way to have fun and a bit of a laugh.

The end of a main standing camp is usually marked by two major events, Merrymoot and Lodge Common Council.

Merrymoot is an expanded camp fire session, where the whole camp gathers to entertain one another with sketches and improvisations as well as many of the traditional songs.

Lodge Common Council is a formal occasion, usually on the final night, where the entire camp gathers round a special fire. This is traditionally octagonal in shape, and may be some five feet high, though in practice the shape is more commonly rectangular. Before lighting the fire, a few coals from the previous year are added to the fire, which is then lit in front of the whole body of the camp.

Once the fire is burning, campers will review the camp and may suggest changes in activities or emphasis for the following year.

Groups
People on camp have traditionally been separated into the following groups, although some experimental camps have varied this arrangement:

Pixies - Children who are too young to go alone and must be accompanied by a parent or relative
Elves - Children between the ages of 6 and a half and 8.
Woodlings - Children between the ages of 9 and 11.
Trailseekers - Children between the ages of 12 and 13.
Trackers - Children between the ages of 14 and 15.
Pathfinders - Children between the ages of 16 and 17.
Pixie parents- the parent or relative looking after a pixie
Waywardens - Adults who require special attention due to disabilities
Staff - Adults who care for the children and co-operatively run the whole camp. With the exception of camp chiefs (who are in overall charge of the entire camp) and caterers (responsible for food), staff are split into groups that look after the different age groups. In each group there is also a group chief.

Generally FSC age groups are based on school year rather than birthday. As most camps take place before September, this means it is possible to have campers whose ages do not exactly fit with the groupings listed above (e.g. 15-year-old Pathfinders).

From 2007, as a trial, the age groups have been amended slightly (to those given above), increasing the age range slightly in the lower groups, and reducing it for the pathfinders, to allow the camps to accommodate slightly more older children without distorting the number in each age group. As a high percentage of children who begin camping with FSC fall in love with camp and want to stay on until their final year, when they participate in a coming of age ceremony, when the pathfinder age group previously encompassed ages 15, 16 and 17, there were always more applications from pathfinders than spaces for them to fill. The change in age groups has compensated for this and now more children are able to continue camping into their final year.

Camps 

Each camp has a different agenda and model, set by tradition and the Camp Chief. There are several different identifiable types:

 Standing camps
 These are set in regularly used locations, at sites generally used for many years, and where a relationship has been built up with the landowners. Sites may be on remote hill farms among mountainous country, or on land in lowland areas. Most camps are in this format and children need to attend at least 2 of these camps to experience FSC life before being able to try activity camps as below. A variety of standard and novel activities take place on these camps, and they can be exciting and challenging, but they are less demanding physically than some of the mobile and activity camps. They may have a theme or special interest depending on the interests of the camp leaders and staff.

Both basic and more advanced camping skills are learnt during Standing Camps, particularly during the first part of the camp. These skills are consolidated by the 'hike', during which each age group walks with its staff away from the site for two, three or four nights, taking just their essential camping gear with them. The distance travelled and the time away from the main camp depend on the age of the children in the group.

 Mobile camps
 These camps generally do not have a single fixed campsite. They move on most days and are based around walking in lowland or mountain environments, cycling, canoeing or other activities. Whilst most mobiles are based in the United Kingdom some are based abroad.

Semi-mobile camps
Semi-mobiles are essentially Mobiles, however may either have a site on which they spend a period of time before beginning the journey or have a fixed location (often known as a base camp) from which small trips are made most days.

 Caving camps
 These camps are usually based in a caving hut with day adventures out into local caves. These camps often include a day of overground exploration. Recent camps have taken place in parts of the UK such as the Mendips, Devon, Yorkshire and South Wales. Caving camps are often described by those who frequent them as part of the "real heart of FSC", with the same people attending them year after year, and strong friendships being built up.

 Conservation and Skills camps
 These are a special form of standing camps focused on a particular work project, usually an environmental project of some sort. These camps restricted to over 16s or over 18s depending on their nature and leaders.

 Associate Camps
 These are run and organised by FSC associates, usually parents of child campers, but can also include staff from children's camps. They are generally shorter weekend camps, and do not follow exactly the same structure as standard child camps, but are similar in ethos and are open to family groups, children are cared for by their own parents/guardians rather than staff.

FSC Glee
One part of FSC camps is the communal singing and sharing of traditional and contemporary songs. A campfire is often held in the evening where people are encouraged to sing. FSC song books are also printed every few years, these contain some of the more common songs sung on camps. A virtual version of these books is available at the FSC glee website. A few songs unique to FSC such as the Poll Tax song have been written by members and remain part of the oral tradition.

Primary sources
The historical records of the Forest School Camps are held in the Archives of the community Institute of Education, University of London and a full catalogue can be found on-line.

References

External links
 Forest School Camps website
 FSC in the news
 Forest School Camps collection at the Institute of Education Archives.

Children's charities based in the United Kingdom
Summer camps in the United Kingdom